Cethosia penthesilea, the orange lacewing, is a species of heliconiine butterfly found in Southeast Asia, as well as the Australia's Northern Territory.

Larval food: Lacewing Vine (Adenia heterophylla).

Subspecies
C. p. methypsea (Butler, 1879) – plain lacewing
C. p. paksha (Fruhstorfer, 1905) – orange lacewing

References 

Acraeini
Butterflies of Australia
Butterflies of Indochina
Butterflies described in 1777